Silver selenide (Ag2Se) is the reaction product formed when selenium toning analog silver gelatine photo papers in photographic print toning. The selenium toner contains sodium selenite (Na2SeO3) as one of its active ingredients, which is the source of the selenide (Se2−) anion combining with the silver in the toning process.

It is found in nature as the mineral naumannite, a comparatively rare silver mineral which has nevertheless become recognized as important silver compound in some low-sulfur silver ores from mines in Nevada and Idaho.

Structure
Silver selenide has two crystal phases on the bulk phase diagram. At lower temperatures, it has an orthorhombic structure, β-Ag2Se. This orthorhombic phase, stable at room temperature, is a narrow-gap semiconductor, with space group P212121. The exact size of the band gap has been given variously from 0.02 eV to 0.22 eV.

There is also a high temperature cubic phase, α-Ag2Se., which it transforms into at temperatures above 130 °C. This high temperature phase has space group Imm, No. 229, Pearson symbol cI20. The phase transition increases ionic conductivity by 10,000 times to about 2 S/cm.

A third metastable phase with a monoclinic structure and space group P21/n is known to form for colloidal AgSe nanocrystals. The crystal structure of this polymorph is highly related to the acanthite phase of silver sulfide. For AgSe, this polymorph is increasingly unstable for larger crystallites, which explains its absence on the bulk phase diagram. It is thought that the influence of the surface energy plays a role stabilizing this phase on the nanoscale, thus allowing its experimental isolation. Electronic structure calculations for this polymorph of AgSe suggest that it is a narrow-gap semiconductor, which is supported by experimental evidence as well. Prior to 2021, the crystal structure of this polymorph was unknown, and this material was informally referred to as a "tetragonal" or "pseudo-tetragonal" polymorph of AgSe. This terminology, while not technically correct, is prevalent in the literature pertaining to this metastable phase of AgSe.

References

Silver compounds
Selenides
Photographic chemicals